Diogo Casimiro da Silva Costa (born 14 December 1998) is a Portuguese footballer who plays for Braga B as a defender.

Football career
On 3 November 2018, Casimiro made his professional debut with Braga B in a 2018–19 LigaPro match against Famalicão.

References

External links

1998 births
Living people
People from Oliveira de Azeméis
Portuguese footballers
Association football defenders
Liga Portugal 2 players
Segunda Divisão players
S.C. Freamunde players
S.C. Braga B players
Sportspeople from Aveiro District